Elelea concinna is a species of beetle in the family Cerambycidae. It was described by Francis Polkinghorne Pascoe in 1857. It is known from Borneo and Malaysia.

References

Mesosini
Beetles described in 1857